The 1996–97 LEN Champions League was the ongoing 34th edition of LEN's premier competition for men's water polo clubs. It ran from 1996 to 5 April 1997, and it was contested by 8 teams. The Final Four (semifinals, final, and third place game) took place on April 4 and April 5 in Naples.

Preliminary round

Blue Group

Red Group

Final Four (Naples)

Final standings

See also
1996–97 LEN Cup Winners' Cup
1996–97 LEN Cup

LEN Champions League seasons
1996 in water polo
1997 in water polo
Champions League